William Peltz (born May 30, 1986) is an American actor, who is best known for his roles in Unfriended  Men, Women & Children and Manifest.

Early life
Peltz was born in New York City, the son of Nelson Peltz, a billionaire businessman. Peltz's father is of Austrian Jewish and Russian Jewish descent, while his mother has German, Welsh, and English ancestry. Peltz celebrated his becoming a Bar Mitzvah. Among his siblings are actress Nicola Peltz and ice hockey defenceman Brad Peltz. He has seven siblings, and two half-siblings from his father's previous marriages.

Peltz played hockey in his youth, advancing to Tier III Junior hockey with the New Jersey Hitmen.

Career
Peltz became interested in acting while reading scripts with his sister Nicola. In 2009, he moved to Los Angeles and secured his first roles in film productions. In 2014, he had his first major role in Jason Reitman's drama Men, Women & Children. That same year, he starred in the horror film Unfriended as Adam Sewell.

Personal life

He and his sister actress Nicola Peltz have matching Hebrew tattoos on their ribs, that read: "family".

He has been in a relationship with fashion model Kenya Kinski-Jones since 2011.

Filmography

Film

Television

Music videos

References

External links 

 

1986 births
Living people
Male actors from New York City
American male film actors
American male television actors
21st-century American male actors
Peltz family
Jewish American male actors
21st-century American Jews